Marc Quaghebeur (born Tournai, 1947) is a Belgian poet and essayist. He is director of the Archives and Museum of Literature in Brussels. He has a truly Belgian surname. It derives from Dutch Kwagebeur and has been adapted to the French spelling tradition.

Bibliography 
Essays
 1982 : Balises pour l’histoire de nos lettres, Brussels, Promotion des Lettres.
 1990 : Lettres belges. Entre absence et magie, Labor
 1990 : Un pays d'irréguliers Labor. Collaboration de Jean-Pierre Verheggen et V. Jago-Antoine
 1990 : Vivre à la mort, parler, n'être rien, être personne. Une lecture de "Oui" de Thomas Bernhard, Actes Sud
 1993 : Belgique : la première des littératures francophones non françaises, Akademisk forlag
 1998 : Balises pour l'histoire des lettres belges, Labor. Postface de Paul Aron
 2006 : Anthologie de la littérature française de Belgique : entre réel et surréel, Racine
 2015 : Histoire Forme et Sens en Littérature. La Belgique francophone. Tome 1 : L'engendrement (1815/1914), Peter Lang 
 2017 : Histoire Forme et Sens en Littérature. La Belgique francophone. Tome 2 : L'ébranlement (1914/1944), Peter Lang 

Poetry
 1976 : Forclaz, P-J. Oswald
 1979 : Le Cycle de la morte. 1. L'Herbe seule, L'Âge d'homme 
 1983 : Le Cycle de la morte. 2. Chiennelures, Fata Morgana
 1987 : Le Cycle de la morte. 3. L'Outrage, Fata Morgana
 1989 : Le Cycle de la morte. 4. Oiseaux, Jacques Antoine éditeur 
 1990 : Le Cycle de la morte. 5. À la morte, Fata Morgana 
 1991 : Les Vieilles, Tétras Lyre
 1993 : Les Carmes du Saulchoir, L’Ether vague
 1994 : Fins de siècle, La Maison de la poésie de Amay
 1994 : L'Effroi l'errance, Tétras Lyre
 1999 : La Nuit de Yuste, Le Cormier
 2006 : Clairs obscurs : petites proses, Le Temps qu'il fait

Novels
 2012 : Les Grands Masques, La Renaissance du livre
 
Collective works
 1992 : Papier blanc, encre noire : Cent ans de culture francophone en Afrique Centrale (Zaïre, Rwanda et Burundi), Labor
 1997 : Emile Verhaeren: un musée imaginaire, AML/RMN
 1997 : France - Belgique (1848 - 1914): affinités - ambiguïtés, Labor
 1997 : Belgique francophone : quelques façons de dire les mixités, Braumüller Verlag
 2000 : Aux pays du fleuve et des grands lacs : chocs et rencontres des cultures de 1885 à nos jours, AML
 2002 : Présence - Absence de Maurice Maeterlinck, AML/Labor
 2002 : Afriques, Écriture 59
 2003 : Henry Bauchau en Suisse, Écriture 61
 2003 : Entre aventures, syllogismes et confessions : Belgique, Roumanie, Suisse, AML/PIE-Peter Lang
 2003 : Les constellations impérieuses d'Henry Bauchau, AML/Labor 
 2006 : Les écrivains francophones interprètes de l'Histoire: entre filiation et dissidence, AML/Labor
 2006 : L'Europe et les Francophonies: langue, littérature, histoire, image, PIE-Peter Lang
 2007 : Les Villes du symbolisme, PIE-Peter Lang
 2008 : La Belgique en toutes lettres, Labor
 2008 : Mémoires et antimémoires littéraires au XXe siècle: La Première Guerre mondiale, PIE-Peter Lang
 2008 : Analyse et enseignement des littératures francophones: tentatives, réticences, responsabilités, Pie-Peter Lang
 2008 : L'œuvre en chantier, AML éditions
 2009 : Cinquante ans au service des Lettres et du théâtre, AML éditions
 2013 : Francophonies d'Europe, du Maghreb et du Machrek. PIE-Peter Lang
 2013 : Violence et Vérité dans les Littératures francophones. PIE-Peter Lang
 2013 : Les Sagas francophones. PIE-Peter Lang

References

Belgian writers in French
1947 births
Living people